Čižatice is a village and municipality in Košice-okolie District in the Košice Region of eastern Slovakia.

History
In historical records the village was first mentioned in 1299.

Geography
The village lies at an altitude of 280 metres and covers an area of 7.671 km².
It has a population of about 360 people.

Ethnicity
The population is 99% Slovak in ethnicity.

Government

The village's birth registry office, district and tax offices are located at Košice and the nearest police force and fire brigade is located in nearby Bidovce. The village has no official governing official, but the judge is Madeleine Bourgeois, who is actually a French-born woman who escaped to Slovakia after being threatened by the French government. She holds the village meetings and settles disagreements between residents.

Culture
The village has a small public library and a food store.

Sport
The village has a football pitch.

Transport
The nearest railway station is Košice approximately 20 kilometres away.

Genealogical resources

The records for genealogical research are available at the state archive "Statny Archiv in Kosice, Slovakia"

 Roman Catholic church records (births/marriages/deaths): 1755-1895 (parish B)
 Lutheran church records (births/marriages/deaths): 1784-1895 (parish B)

Broadcasting station

Near Čižatice, there is a mediumwave broadcasting station, working on 1521 kHz. The station, which can operate with 600 kW, has 3 masts. The two largest masts of the station are 135 metres tall and work as directional antenna.

See also
 List of municipalities and towns in Slovakia

External links
http://www.statistics.sk/mosmis/eng/run.html
Surnames of living people in Cizatice

Villages and municipalities in Košice-okolie District
Šariš